Nadjib Riphat Kesoema DSG (born 23 March 1953) is an Indonesian diplomat and was Ambassador to Australia and Vanuatu until 2017. He has been awarded four cultural awards from Belgium including Chevalier d'honorarium (knight) from the Haute Confrerie Royal du Noble Corcieli of the city of Oostende  as well as the Order of St. Gregory the Great - The Holy See by Pope John Paul II.

He was Deputy Minister of the Coordinating Minister for Political, Legal and Security Affairs from 2011 to 2012 and also Ambassador to the European Union, Belgium and Luxembourg from 2006 to 2010.
He is the first Ambassador to Belgium with the accreditation to both European Union and the Grand Duchy of Luxembourg.

In 2013, following the allegations of mobile phone tapping by the Australian government on Indonesian's high-ranking officials in the Australia–Indonesia spying scandal, Nadjib was recalled immediately as a sign of protest by the Indonesian Government. Australian Prime Minister Tony Abbott initially declined to apologise or comment on the matter, prompting accusations from President Susilo Bambang Yudhoyono that he had "belittled" Indonesia's response to the issue.

Early life
Born at Medan, Riphat graduated from Padjadjaran University in 1975 where he studied political psychology.

Career
Nadjib joined the Ministry of Foreign Affairs from university. Between 1986 and 1989, Riphat served as First Secretary for Political Affairs at the Indonesian Embassy in Oslo, Norway.

Following his return from Norway, he held several positions such as Counselor to the Indonesian Embassy to the Holy See where he was awarded the DSG from the Pope; Head of Education and Training of the Indonesian Ministry of Foreign affairs; Minister Counselor to Australia; the first Ambassador Extraordinary and Plenipotentiary to both the Kingdom of Belgium, and to the European Union; Deputy Minister of the Ministry of Political, Legal and Security Affairs; and finally as Ambassador Extraordinary and Plenipotentiary to Australia.

Honours
Chevalier d'honorarium (knight) from the Haute Confrerie Royal du Noble Corcieli of the city of Oostende, 2009.
Order of St. Gregory the Great, 1994 from Pope John Paul II.

References

Living people
1953 births
Ambassadors of Indonesia to Australia
Ambassadors of Indonesia to Vanuatu
Indonesian diplomats
People from Medan
Lampung people